Nagar is a village in the Khargram CD block in the Kandi subdivision of Murshidabad district in the state of West Bengal, India. It is located about 190 km from Kolkata, the state capital.

Geography

Location
Nagar is located at

Area overview
The area shown in the map alongside, covering Berhampore and Kandi subdivisions, is spread across both the natural physiographic regions of the district, Rarh and Bagri. The headquarters of Murshidabad district, Berhampore, is in this area. The entire area is overwhelmingly rural with over 80% of the population living in the rural areas.

Note: The map alongside presents some of the notable locations in the subdivisions. All places marked in the map are linked in the larger full screen map.

Demographics
According to the 2011 Census of India, Nagar had a total population of 11,882, of which 6,198 (52%) were males and 5,684 (48%) were females. Population in the age range 0–6 years was 1,472. The total number of literate persons in Nagar was 7,096 (68.17% of the population over 6 years).

Civic administration

CD block HQ
The headquarters of Khargram CD block are located at Nagar.

Transport
State Highway 7 (Badshahi Road) running from Rajgram (in Birbhum district) to Midnapore (in Paschim Medinipur district) passes through Nagar.

Nagar has 24×7 bus service form local bus stand. Many local and Government buses stop at Nagar bus stand. NBSTC, SBSTC buses are going to Siliguri, Maldah, Kolkata, Digha, Kharagpur, Burdhaman, Durgapur, Asansol etc. daily.

Education

Colleges
 Nagar College was eatblished in 1998 at Nagar. Affiliated to the University of Kalyani, it offers honours courses in Bengali, English, Sanskrit, Arabic, philosophy, political science, history, geography and mathematics.
 Khargram College Of Education 
 Syed Muztoba Ali College Of Education

High schools
 Nagar A.M. High School
 Margram High School
 Bongodighi High School
 Parulia High School
 Sherpur High School
 Kanduri High School
 Purapara High School
 Durgapur High School
 Joypur High School
 Indrani High School
 Saundi High School

Madrasas
 Nagar Al-Qurania High Madrasha
 Margram High Madrasha.
Keshiadanga Ghanashyampur High Madrasah.

Tourism
There is a mosque named 'Nagar Jame Masjid' ,is one of the largest mosques of Murshidabad. It has two minars which are covered with marble. Nagar Fair is  arranged every year on 5 January in the pirtala ground which is located near Nagar Dighi, for ''Data Pir.
Nagar Agricultural farm is alos very popular.In Eid and Durga Puja People from villages around Nagar come here to enjoy .

References

Villages in Murshidabad district